Stefan Schäfer (born 6 January 1986) is a German road and track cyclist. He competed in the individual pursuit and team pursuit event at the 2012 UCI Track Cycling World Championships.

Major results

2003
 National Junior Road Championships
3rd Road race
3rd Time trial
2004
 National Junior Road Championships
2nd Road race
3rd Time trial
 3rd Time trial, UCI Junior Road World Championships
2005
 3rd Time trial, National Under-23 Road Championships
2007
 3rd Time trial, National Under-23 Road Championships
2008
 1st Stage 1 Thüringen Rundfahrt der U23
 2nd Time trial, National Under-23 Road Championships
2009
 1st  Team pursuit, National Track Championships
 1st Memoriał Henryka Łasaka
 2nd Overall Okolo Slovenska
2010
 1st  Team pursuit, National Track Championships
 1st Stage 2 Tour de Serbie
 1st Stage 5 Tour of Bulgaria
 3rd Overall Course de Solidarność et des Champions Olympiques
2011
 1st  Team pursuit, National Track Championships
 1st Overall Tour of Greece
1st Stages 4 & 5
 1st Stage 4 Cinturón a Mallorca
2012
 6th Memoriał Henryka Łasaka
2013
 National Track Championships
1st  Individual pursuit
1st  Team pursuit
 3rd Overall Course de Solidarność et des Champions Olympiques
2014
 1st  Individual pursuit, National Track Championships
 1st Stage 3 Istrian Spring Trophy
 3rd Banja Luka–Belgrade II
 6th Banja Luka–Belgrade I
 7th Himmerland Rundt
 8th Central European Tour Košice–Miskolc
 8th Central European Tour Budapest GP
 9th Rund um Köln
2015
 1st  Madison, National Track Championships (with Christian Grasmann)

References

External links
 
 

1986 births
Living people
Sportspeople from Forst (Lausitz)
People from Bezirk Cottbus
German track cyclists
German male cyclists
Cyclists from Brandenburg
21st-century German people